Eastern Beach can refer to:

Eastern Beach, Gibraltar
Eastern Beach, New Zealand
Eastern Beach (Victoria), Geelong, Australia